Giulio Marchetti (9 June  1911 – 1 December 1993) was an Italian stage, film and television actor and presenter.

Life and career 
Born in Barcelona, Marchetti was the grandson of the operetta actor and comedian Giulio and the son of the theatrical artistic director Adriano. 

After completing high school in Bologna, he began his stage career as a vaudeville actor and singer in the style of the American minstrel show performers. He got a large popularity between early 1940s and mid-1950s, thanks to a series of successful revues. He was also active, as a character actor, in a number of films and television series, often working alongside Totò.

Marchetti is also well known in Italy as the presenter for many years of the show Giochi senza frontiere. In the early 1970s he decided to abandon the showbusiness and became the owner of a service station.

Partial filmography

 Fear and Sand (1948) - Paquito
 Adam and Eve (1949) - Il naufrago americano
 Maracatumba... ma non è una rumba! (1949) - Attrazione internazionale, Himself
 Fugitive Lady (1950) - Giovanni
 L'inafferrabile 12 (1950) - Il commissario
 I cadetti di Guascogna (1950)
 Accidents to the Taxes!! (1951) - Il baritono russo
 My Heart Sings (1951) - Friend of Russo (uncredited)
 Stranger on the Prowl (1952) - Signor Raffetto
 Vacations in Majorca (1959) - Barman (uncredited)
 Giuseppina (1960) - Petrol Station Owner/Father (Filmed 1959)
 Conspiracy of Hearts (1960) - Italian Soldier
 Tough Guys (1960) - Bernabeu
 I piaceri del sabato notte (1960) - Un altro cliente svizzero
 Nefertiti, Queen of the Nile (1961) - Meck
 Totò Diabolicus (1962) - Private Detective
 Roaring Years (1962)
 The Secret Mark of D'Artagnan (1962) - The King
 Swordsman of Siena (1962) - Carlos' servant
 The Executioner of Venice (1963) - Bartolo
 The Lion of St. Mark (1963) - Gualtiero
 Sandokan to the Rescue (1964) - Sagapar
 The Secret Invasion (1964) - Italian Officer
 Sandokan Against the Leopard of Sarawak (1964) - Sagapar
 Le tardone (1964) - Manuele (episode "L'armadio")
 Stranger in Sacramento (1965) - Sheriff Joe
 The Adventurer of Tortuga (1965) - Father of the Bride
 The Rover (1967) - Peyrol's first mate
 The Biggest Bundle of Them All (1968) - Lt. Naldi
 La vuole lui... lo vuole lei (1968)
  (1971) - Dr. Castell (uncredited)
 '' (1988) - Receptionist in high-class hotel (final film role)

References

External links
 

1911 births
1993 deaths
Italian male film actors
Italian male television actors
People from Barcelona